Kim Kwang-suk (January 1964 – January 14, 2018) was a North Korean singer of the Pochonbo Electronic Ensemble.

It was said she inspired the creation of the Moranbong band.

Biography
In 1983, Kim visited Japan as part of the Pyongyang Student Youth Arts Troupe. She became a member of the Pochonbo Electronic Ensemble in 1986. Her husband was Jon Kwon, who was a pianist for the Pochonbo Electronic Ensemble.

References

North Korean women singers
North Korean actresses
Pochonbo Electronic Ensemble
1964 births
Date of birth missing
Place of birth missing
2018 deaths
Korean-language singers